Edel Hevia (born 22 February 1977) is a retired Cuban sprinter.

References

1977 births
Living people
Cuban male sprinters
Athletes (track and field) at the 1999 Pan American Games
Central American and Caribbean Games gold medalists for Cuba
Competitors at the 1998 Central American and Caribbean Games
Central American and Caribbean Games medalists in athletics
Pan American Games competitors for Cuba
20th-century Cuban people
21st-century Cuban people